Joelle Garguilo is an American journalist, host, digital journalist and reporter, working for NBC Universal, appearing on all platforms, including NBC News, Today, today.com, msnbc.com, iVillage and WNBC, incl. daily lifestyle show "New York Live".

Garguilo is a correspondent and Orange room producer on Weekend Today.

She is also a correspondent for WNBC's lifestyle program New York Live.

References

American television journalists
American women television journalists
NBC News people
Living people
1981 births
21st-century American women